The Oxford Farming Conference (OFC) is an annual conference for the UK's farmers that takes place in Oxford, United Kingdom, in the first week of January.

The 73rd annual conference will run from 2–4 January 2019 at University of Oxford's Examination Schools, in the High Street, central Oxford. The theme “World of Opportunity" will be explored and discussed by visionary speakers from around the world. Future farming, innovation and the world beyond Brexit will be three key topics at the 2019 event.

Speakers in the past have included (listed in their role at time of conference):
 Secretary of State for Environment, Food and Rural Affairs, Hilary Benn, 
 chief scientist of the UK government's Department for Environment, Food and Rural Affairs (Defra), Professor Robert Watson
 NFU President Peter Kendall
 RT Hon Owen Paterson MP
 Secretary of State for the Environment, Food and Rural Affairs RT Hon Elizabeth Truss MP
 Secretary of State for Environment, Food and Rural Affairs (Defra), George Eustice MP
 Cabinet Secretary for Environment and Rural Affairs Wales, Lesley Griffiths
 Director General of the National Trust, Dame Helen Ghosh
 Chief Strategy Officer AHDB, Tom Hind

The OFC has been mentioned in the long-running BBC Radio 4 series, The Archers.

References

External links 
 Oxford Farming Conference website

Conferences in the United Kingdom
Annual events in England
Events in Oxford
Agricultural organisations based in the United Kingdom